The 1988 Cork Intermediate Hurling Championship was the 79th staging of the Cork Intermediate Hurling Championship since its establishment by the Cork County Board in 1909. The draw for the opening round fixtures took place on 13 December 1987. The championship began on 28 May 1988 and ended on 16 October 1988.

On 16 October 1988, Youghal won the championship following a 4–06 to 2–11 defeat of Kilbrittain in the final at Páirc Uí Chaoimh. This was their third championship title overall and their first title since 1969.

Youghal's Seánie Ring was the championship's top scorer with 2-24.

Results

First round

Second round

Quarter-finals

Semi-finals

Final

Championship statistics

Top scorers

Overall

In a single game

References

Cork Intermediate Hurling Championship
Cork Intermediate Hurling Championship